The Akçakoca gas field is a natural gas field located on the continental shelf of the Black Sea. It was discovered in 2004 and developed by a consortium consisting of Türkiye Petrolleri Anonim Ortaklığı, Petrol Ofisi, Tiway Oil and Stratic Oil. It began production in 2007 and produces natural gas and condensates. The total proven reserves of the Akçakoca gas field are around 127 billion cubic feet (3.6×109m³), and production is slated to be around 50 million cubic feet/day (1.4×106m³) in 2015.

References

Black Sea energy
Natural gas fields in Turkey